Casualty notification is the process of notifying relatives of people who have been killed or seriously injured unexpectedly (for example, in a car crash). The notification may be done over the phone or in person, but is normally done by a police officer in person when possible, at least for the next of kin.

In the case of the United States armed forces, the notification is done by a specialist known as a casualty notification officer (CNO), normally within four hours of learning of the casualty (but only from 6:00 a.m. to 10:00 p.m. local time) or, for the Navy, by a casualty assistance calls officer (CACO).

Denny Hayes, who spent fifteen years as a chaplain for the FBI’s critical response team, says:
 Always deliver bad news in person. 
 Always bring a partner (“95 percent of them defer to me to do the actual speaking of the words—nobody wants to experience sad”). 
 Skip the euphemisms—they comfort no one except the person speaking them. 
 Never abandon anyone until they have someone else to hold on to. 

"You can’t make it better," said Dr. Nancy Davis, former chief of counseling services for the FBI. "But you can definitely make it worse."

See also 

Death notification

References

External links 

 Briefing On Casualty Notification

War casualties
Acknowledgements of death
Human communication